Leo Rising is the second and final studio album by American  music  duo Karmin, released exclusively on Apple Music on September 9, 2016, before being released to all other platforms on September 23, 2016. It is the follow-up to their 2014 major label debut Pulses. Preceding the album's release, five singles were released to promote the album: "Along the Road", "Didn't Know You", "Come with Me (Pure Imagination)", "Sugar", and "Blame It on My Heart".

Background and concept
In preparing for the album's release, husband and wife duo Amy Heidemann-Noonan and Nick Noonan met with an astrologist to understand the signs of the horoscope, drawing inspiration from each of them in writing the album's twelve tracks.

Three tracks, "Yesterday" (previously released as a digital single), "Maybelline" and "Young in Love" were originally slated for the album but did not make the final cut. "Young in Love" was later given to artist Borgeous, who released it as a single in late 2016 featuring vocals from Karmin.

Singles
The first single from Leo Rising, "Sugar", was originally released in October 2014, but has since been amended multiple times with a re-release version of the single impacting radio on April 29, 2016. A new version then appeared on Leo Rising. It is the Taurus track. Three music videos have been released for the single. The couch video was released on October 14, 2014. A teaser for the second music video was released on January 27, 2015, before the video's release on February 28, 2015. A music video for the re-released version of the track was later released on May 16, 2016 and had minor edits made to it.

"Along the Road" was the second single from the album, however was not intended to appear on Leo Rising. It was released on March 24, 2015. It appeared on the album after the duo felt that some songs needed to be swapped out for others. It is the Libra track from the album.

"Didn't Know You" was announced as the lead single from Leo Rising before the track listing's shuffle, and impacted radio on June 2, 2015, along with its release to streaming and purchasing platforms. A music video was released to their Vevo page on July 16, 2015.

"Come with Me (Pure Imagination)" was the fourth single from the album, it was a remix/cover of the song "Pure Imagination" by Gene Wilder from the 1971 film Willy Wonka & the Chocolate Factory. Its music video was released to their YouTube channel shortly after its release before being taken down and uploaded to their Vevo channel on August 19, 2016.

"Blame It on My Heart" was released as the fifth single from the album on August 5, 2016, with its corresponding music video being released on the same day.

Promotional singles
Easy Money was released as the first and only promotional single on October 28, 2015.

Couch videos
After the release of the original music video for "Sugar", Karmin came up with the idea to create couch videos to every song from Leo Rising.

The "Sugar" couch video was released on October 14, 2014.

The second, for "Easy Money" was released on September 23, 2016.

"I Got You" followed on September 24, "Dance with You" on September 25, "Didn't Know You" on September 27, "No Suitcase" on September 28, "Come with Me (Pure Imagination)" on September 29, "Everything" on September 30, "Along the Road" on October 1, "Can't Live" on October 2, "Blame It on My Heart" on October 3, "Save Me Now" on October 4, and the bonus track "Love Is Louder" received a music video rather than a couch video on November 7.

Commercial performance
Leo Rising reached number 27 on the Billboard Independent Albums chart on the week ending October 1, 2016.

Track listing

Charts

References

2016 albums
Karmin albums
Indie pop albums by American artists